Mongolian Taiwanese or Taiwanese Mongolian may refer to:
Mongolians in Taiwan
Multiracial people of Taiwanese and Mongolian descent
Mongolia–Taiwan relations